Maxine D. Hayes (born 1946) is an American public health expert who was the State Health Officer for Washington state from 1998 until 2013. She was elected to the National Academy of Medicine in 2006 and awarded the American Public Health Association Martha May Eliot Award.

Early life and education 
Hayes grew up Mississippi in the Jim Crow south. She was an undergraduate student in biology at Spelman College. She spent 1967 as a Merrill Scholar on a year abroad in Vienna, at the same time as Shirley F. Marks and where she said she first felt free of segregation. To prepare herself for a year of non-English tuition, she spent the summer before her year abroad on an intense German course, and lived with a German family who did not speak any English. During her year in Vienna, Martin Luther King Jr. and Robert F. Kennedy Jr. were assassinated. When she returned to the United States the civil rights movement had ended, and new opportunities were open for African-American people. Hayes has said, “Prior to going overseas, I couldn’t imagine ever going to medical school. African Americans were not accepted into graduate school disciplines,”. She moved to the School of Medicine at the University at Buffalo, where she worked toward a medical degree. She chose to attend the University at Buffalo because of the Roswell Park Comprehensive Cancer Center.

Research and career 
Hayes trained in paediatrics at the Vanderbilt University Medical Center and the Boston Children's Hospital. Once she had completed her specialist training, Hayes joined Harvard T.H. Chan School of Public Health, where she completed a Master's in Public Health. She worked with the University of Massachusetts Medical School Project COPE, which looked to provide healthcare to the mothers of babies born in prison.

Hayes was made a teaching fellow at the University of Mississippi Medical Center in 1977, where she would eventually serve on the Disease Control Advisory Committee for Immunization Practices. She moved to Washington in 1985, where she was appointed medical director of a Children's Clinic that supported Seattle's low income population. A few years later, Hayes joined the Washington State Department of Health, where she was made State Health Officer in 1998. She held this position until 2013, working to advise governments of influenza outbreaks and public-health issues. She serves on the board of Healthy Food America.

Awards and honors 

 1967 Charles Merrill Jr. Scholarship, Vienna 1967-68
 2002 Nathan Davis Award for Outstanding Government Service
 2017 American Public Health Association Martha May Eliot Award

Selected publications

References 

1946 births
Living people
American public health doctors
University at Buffalo alumni
Spelman College alumni
Harvard University alumni
University of Mississippi faculty
Members of the National Academy of Medicine
Women public health doctors